Jing was a screencasting computer program released in November 2007 as Jing Project by the TechSmith Corporation. Users must create an account before they can use the software, which must be installed on their computer. Its simple format and the ability to upload captures instantly have made Jing useful in virtual library references.

The software took a picture or video of the user's computer screen and uploaded it to the Web, FTP, computer or clipboard. If uploaded to the web, the program automatically created a URL to the content so it could be shared with others.

Jing Pro

Releasement 
On 6 January 2009, TechSmith released Jing Pro, which is a paid premium version of Jing. Unlike the free version, the professional version supports MPEG-4 saving, watermarks at the beginning and end of the video is not included, uploading to YouTube and working with cameras.

Retirement 
In February 2012, Techsmith announced Jing Pro is to be retired. All users (regardless of subscription) could use this service until 28 February 2013.

End of Support 
On 14 July 2020, Techsmith shut down the support for uploading to Screencast.com in line with the previously-announced end of support for Jing. TechSmith also changed the Jing product page to point to a new product named TechSmith Capture that performs a similar function.

See also
Comparison of screencasting software
Screencasting software

References

2007 software
Screencasting software
Screenshot software
MacOS text-related software
Windows text-related software